Berosus pantherinus is a species of hydrophilid beetle native to the United States. It was originally described by John Lawrence LeConte in 1855 and is characterized by having ten dark spots on each elytron.

References

Hydrophilinae
Beetles described in 1855